The Arroyito Dam (in Spanish, Embalse de Arroyito) is the fifth of five dams on the Limay River in northwestern Argentine Patagonia (the Comahue region), at  above mean sea level. It was inaugurated in 1979.

The dam is made of compacted loose materials. It also serves as a check dam for El Chocón, located upstream.

References
  InterTourNet. Embalse Arroyito.
  Región Comahue.

External links

 ENEL Arroyito
 Organismo Regulador de Seguridad de Presas (ORSEP) Arroyito

Dams completed in 1979
Energy infrastructure completed in 1979
Dams in Argentina
Hydroelectric power stations in Argentina
Buildings and structures in Neuquén Province
Buildings and structures in Río Negro Province
Dams on the Limay River